Alfred Watts may refer to:

 Alfred Watts (cricketer) (1859–?), English cricketer
 Alfred Watts (South Australian politician) (1815–1884), Australian politician
 Alfred Watts (Western Australian politician) (1873–1954, Australian politician
Alf Watts, British Communist

See also
Alfred Watt, priest